Jean Broc (1771–1850) was a French neoclassical painter. His most famous work, The Death of Hyacinthos, was completed and exhibited at the Salon in 1801.

Hyacinthus was a young male beauty and lover of the god Apollo.  One day, while playing with a discus, Hyachinthus was struck with the object and consequently died. The painting depicts Apollo's mourning for his dead lover.  Some myths link a jealous Zephyr to the incident, blaming his jealousy of Hyacinthus for a gust of wind resulting in the youth's death.

Broc studied under Jacques-Louis David and is well known for the cultivation of the intellectual group known as Les Primitifs (a.k.a. Barbus or "The Bearded Ones").

References

External links
 

18th-century French painters
French male painters
19th-century French painters
1771 births
1850 deaths
Pupils of Jacques-Louis David
18th-century French male artists